The Walthamstow West by-election of 1 March 1956 was held after the elevation to the Peerage of former Prime Minister, Labour MP (MP) Clement Attlee.

The seat was safe, having been won by Attlee at the 1955 general election by over 9,000 votes

Candidates
Edward Redhead for Labour was a councillor and Alderman
The Conservatives nominated Richard Hornby, who at the time was a copywriter for JWT
The Liberal Party chose Oliver Smedley, who in 1955 had helped found the Institute of Economic Affairs
 Perennial candidate Bill Boaks stood as an independent, which was one of his earliest parliamentary candidacies.

Result of the previous general election

Result of the by-election

References

1956 elections in the United Kingdom
1956 in England
1950s in Essex
March 1956 events in the United Kingdom
Elections in the London Borough of Waltham Forest
By-election, 1956
By-elections to the Parliament of the United Kingdom in London constituencies
West by-election, 1956